Mole Day is an unofficial holiday celebrated among chemists, chemistry students and chemistry enthusiasts on October 23, between 6:02 a.m. and 6:02 p.m., making the date 6:02 10/23 in the American style of writing dates.

Overview
Mole Day originated from a celebration by educator Margaret Christoph.  She wrote an article about her experiences in The Science Teacher in the 1980s Inspired by this article,  Maurice Oehler, a high school chemistry teacher from Prairie du Chien, Wisconsin, founded the National Mole Day Foundation (NMDF) on May 15, 1991.

Many high schools around the United States, South Africa, Australia, and Canada celebrate Mole Day as a way to get their students interested in chemistry, with various activities often related to chemistry or moles.

The American Chemical Society sponsors National Chemistry Week, which occurs from the Sunday through Saturday during which October 23 falls. This makes Mole Day an integral part of National Chemistry Week.

See also
Pi Day
Square Root Day

References

External links
Maurice Oehler obituary

Chemistry events
Observances about science
October observances
Unofficial observances